Wai Ying, formerly called Wai Hoi and Hang Wai, is one of the 31 constituencies in the Kwai Tsing District in Hong Kong.

The constituency returns one district councillor to the Kwai Tsing District Council, with an election every four years. Wai Ying constituency is loosely based on Tierra Verde, Tivoli Garden and Broadview Garden in Tsing Yi with an estimated population of 19,475.

Councillors represented

Election results

2010s

2000s

References

Tsing Yi
Constituencies of Hong Kong
Constituencies of Kwai Tsing District Council
2003 establishments in Hong Kong
Constituencies established in 2003
1999 establishments in Hong Kong
Constituencies established in 1999
1994 establishments in Hong Kong
Constituencies established in 1994